These are the results for the girls' rhythmic individual all-around event at the 2018 Summer Youth Olympics.

Schedule 
All times are local (UTC−3).

Results

Qualification

Final

References

External links
 Qualification Results 
 Final results 

Gymnastics at the 2018 Summer Youth Olympics